The Upper East Regional Museum is a museum located in Bolgatanga, Ghana. The Upper East Regional Museum was established in 1972 and installed in its current location in 1991, by the Ghana National Commission on Culture. The museum is situated behind the Regional Library and adjacent to the craft village.

References

See also 
 List of museums in Ghana
 Upper East Regional Museum, official website

Museums in Ghana
Museums established in 1972
1972 establishments in Ghana
Upper East Region